This list covers hyperaccumulators, plant species which accumulate, or are tolerant of radionuclides (Cd, Cs-137, Co, Pu-238, Ra, Sr, U-234, 235, 238), hydrocarbons and organic solvents (Benzene, BTEX, DDT, Dieldrin, Endosulfan, Fluoranthene, MTBE, PCB, PCNB, TCE and by-products), and inorganic solvents (Potassium ferrocyanide).

See also:
Hyperaccumulators table – 1 : Ag, Al, As, Be, Cr, Cu, Hg, Mn, Mo, Naphthalene, Pb, Pd, Se, Zn
Hyperaccumulators table – 2 : Nickel

{| class="wikitable sortable" style="text-align:center"
|+ hyperaccumulators and contaminants: Radionuclides, Hydrocarbons and Organic Solvents – accumulation rates
! Contaminant || Accumulation rates (in mg/kg of dry weight) || Latin name || English name || H-Hyperaccumulator or A-Accumulator P-Precipitator T-Tolerant || Notes || Sources
|-
| Cd || || Athyrium yokoscense || (Japanese false spleenwort?) || Cd(A), Cu(H), Pb(H), Zn(H) || Origin Japan ||
|-
| Cd || >100 || Avena strigosa Schreb. || New-OatLopsided Oat or Bristle Oat || || ||
|-
| Cd || H- || Bacopa monnieri || Smooth Water Hyssop, Waterhyssop, Brahmi, Thyme-leafed gratiola, Water hyssop || Cr(H), Cu(H), Hg(A), Pb(A) || Origin India; aquatic emergent species ||
|-
| Cd || || Brassicaceae || Mustards, mustard flowers, crucifers or, cabbage family ||  Cd(H), Cs(H), Ni(H), Sr(H), Zn(H) || Phytoextraction ||
|-
| Cd || A- || Brassica juncea L. || Indian mustard || Cr(A), Cu(H), Ni(H), Pb(H), Pb(P), U(A), Zn(H) || cultivated || 
|-
| Cd || H- || Vallisneria americana || Tape Grass || Cr(A), Cu(H), Pb(H) || Origins Europe and N. Africa; extensively cultivated in the aquarium trade ||
|-
| Cd || >100 || Crotalaria juncea || Sunn or sunn hemp || || High amounts of total soluble phenolics ||
|-
| Cd || H- || Eichhornia crassipes || Water Hyacinth || Cr(A), Cu(A), Hg(H), Pb(H), Zn(A). Also Cs, Sr, U and pesticides || Pantropical/Subtropical, 'the troublesome weed' ||
|-
| Cd || || Helianthus annuus || Sunflower || || Phytoextraction & rhizofiltration || 
|-
| Cd || H- || Hydrilla verticillata || Hydrilla || Cr(A), Hg(H), Pb(H) || ||
|-
| Cd || H- || Lemna minor || Duckweed || Pb(H), Cu(H), Zn(A) || Native to North America and widespread ||
|-
| Cd || T- || Pistia stratiotes || Water lettuce || Cu(T), Hg(H), Cr(H) || Pantropical, Origin South U.S.A.; aquatic herb ||
|-
| Cd || || Salix viminalis L. || Common Osier, Basket Willow || Ag, Cr, Hg, Se, petroleum hydrocarbons, organic solvents, MTBE, TCE and by-products; Pb, U, Zn (S. viminalix); Potassium ferrocyanide (S. babylonica L.) || Phytoextraction. Perchlorate (wetland halophytes) ||
|-
| Cd || || Spirodela polyrhiza || Giant Duckweed || Cr(H), Pb(H), Ni(H), Zn(A) || Native to North America ||
|-
| Cd || >100 || Tagetes erecta L. || African-tall || || Tolerance only. Lipid peroxidation level increases; activities of antioxidative enzymes such as superoxide dismutase, ascorbate peroxidase, glutathione reductase, and catalase are depressed. ||
|-
| Cd || || Thlaspi caerulescens ||  Alpine pennycress || Cr(A), Co(H), Cu(H), Mo, Ni(H), Pb(H), Zn(H) || Phytoextraction. Its rhizosphere's bacterial population is less dense than with Trifolium pratense but richer in specific metal-resistant bacteria. || 
|-
| Cd || 1000 || Vallisneria spiralis || Eel grass || || 37 records of plants; origin India ||
|-
| Cs-137 || || Acer rubrum, Acer pseudoplatanus|| Red maple, Sycamore maple  || Pu-238, Sr-90 || Leaves: much less uptake in Larch and Sycamore maple than in Spruce. ||
|-
| Cs-137 ||  || Agrostis spp. || Agrostis spp. || || Grass or Forb species capable of accumulating radionuclides ||
|-
| Cs-137 || up to 3000 Bq kg-1 || Amaranthus retroflexus ( cv. Belozernii, aureus, Pt-95) || Redroot Amaranth || Cd(H), Cs(H), Ni(H), Sr(H), Zn(H) || Phytoextraction. Can accumulate radionuclides, ammonium nitrate and ammonium chloride as chelating agents. Maximum concentration is reached after 35 days of growth. ||
|-
| Cs-137 || || Brassicaceae || Mustards, mustard flowers, crucifers or, cabbage family || Cd(H), Cs(H), Ni(H), Sr(H), Zn(H) || Phytoextraction. Ammonium nitrate and ammonium chloride as chelating agents. ||
|-
| Cs-137 ||  || Brassica juncea ||  Indian mustard || || Contains 2 to 3 times more Cs-137 in his roots than in the biomass above ground Ammonium nitrate and ammonium chloride as chelating agents. ||
|-
| Cs-137 ||  || Cerastium fontanum || Big Chickweed || || Grass or Forb species capable of accumulating radionuclides ||
|-
| Cs-137 || || Beta vulgaris, Chenopodiaceae, Kail? and/or Salsola? || Beet, Quinoa, Russian thistle || Sr-90, Cs-137 || Grass or Forb species capable of accumulating radionuclides ||
|-
| Cs-137 || || Cocos nucifera || Coconut palm || || Tree able to accumulate radionuclides ||
|-
| Cs-137  || || Eichhornia crassipes || Water hyacinth || U, Sr (high % uptake within a few days). Also Cd(H), Cr(A), Cu(A), Hg(H), Pb, Zn(A) and pesticides. || ||
|-
| Cs-137 ||  || Eragrostis bahiensis(Eragrostis) || Bahia lovegrass || || Glomus mosseae as amendment. It increases the surface area of the plant roots, allowing roots to acquire more nutrients, water and therefore more available radionuclides in soil solution. ||
|-
| Cs-137 || || Eucalyptus tereticornis || Forest redgum || Sr-90 || Tree able to accumulate radionuclides ||
|-
| Cs-137 ||  || Festuca arundinacea || Tall fescue || || Grass or Forb species capable of accumulating radionuclides ||
|-
| Cs-137 ||  || Festuca rubra || Fescue || || Grass or Forb species capable of accumulating radionuclides ||
|-
| Cs-137 ||  || Glomus mosseae as chelating agent(Glomus (fungus)) || Mycorrhizal fungi || || Glomus mosseae as amendment. It increases the surface area of the plant roots, allowing roots to acquire more nutrients, water and therefore more available radionuclides in soil solution. ||
|-
| Cs-137 ||  || Glomus intradices(Glomus (fungus)) || Mycorrhizal fungi || || Glomus mosseae as chelating agent. It increases the surface area of the plant roots, allowing roots to acquire more nutrients, water and therefore more available radionuclides in soil solution. ||
|-
| Cs-137 || 4900-8600 || Helianthus annuus || Sunflower || U, Sr (high % uptake within a few days) || Accumulates up to 8 times more Cs-137 than timothy or foxtail. Contains 2 to 3 times more Cs-137 in his roots than in the biomass above ground.  || 
|-
| Cs-137 || || Larix || Larch || || Leaves: much less uptake in Larch and Sycamore maple than in Spruce. 20% of the translocated caesium into new leaves resulted from root-uptake 2.5 years after the Chernobyl accident. ||
|-
| Cs-137 || || Liquidambar styraciflua || American Sweet Gum || Pu-238, Sr-90 || Tree able to accumulate radionuclides ||
|-
| Cs-137 || || Liriodendron tulipifera || Tulip tree || Pu-238, Sr-90 || Tree able to accumulate radionuclides ||
|-
| Cs-137 ||  || Lolium multiflorum || |Italian Ryegrass  || Sr || Mycorrhizae: accumulates much more Cs-137 and Sr-90 when grown in Sphagnum peat than in any other medium incl. Clay, sand, silt and compost. ||
|-
| Cs-137 ||  || Lolium perenne || Perennial ryegrass || || Can accumulate radionuclides ||
|-
| Cs-137 ||  || Panicum virgatum || Switchgrass  || || ||
|-
| Cs-137 || || Phaseolus acutifolius || Tepary Beans || Cd(H), Cs(H), Ni(H), Sr(H), Zn(H) || Phytoextraction. Ammonium nitrate and ammonium chloride as chelating agents ||
|-
| Cs-137 || || Phalaris arundinacea L. || Reed canary grass ||  Cd(H), Cs(H), Ni(H), Sr(H), Zn(H) Ammonium nitrate and ammonium chloride as chelating agents. || Phytoextraction ||
|-
| Cs-137 || || Picea abies || Spruce || || Conc. about 25-times higher in bark compared to wood, 1.5–4.7 times higher in directly contaminated twig-axes than in leaves.  ||
|-
| Cs-137 || || Pinus radiata, Pinus ponderosa || Monterey Pine, Ponderosa pine || Sr-90. Also petroleum hydrocarbons, organic solvents, MTBE, TCE and by-products (Pinus spp. || Phytocontainment. Tree able to accumulate radionuclides. ||
|-
| Cs-137 || || Sorghum halepense || Johnson Grass || || ||
|-
| Cs-137 || || Trifolium repens || White Clover || || Grass or Forb species capable of accumulating radionuclides ||
|-
| Cs-137 || H || Zea mays || Corn || || High absorption rate. Accumulates radionuclides. Contains 2 to 3 times more Cs137 in his roots than in the biomass above ground. || 
|-
| Co || 1000 to 4304 || Haumaniastrum robertii(Lamiaceae) || Copper flower || || 27 records of plants; origin Africa. Vernacular name: 'copper flower'. This species' phanerogamme has the highest cobalt content. Its distribution could be governed by cobalt rather than copper. ||
|-
| Co || H- || Thlaspi caerulescens || Alpine pennycress || Cd(H), Cr(A), Cu(H), Mo, Ni(H), Pb(H), Zn(H) || Phytoextraction || 
|-
| Pu-238 || || Acer rubrum || Red maple || Cs-137, Sr-90 || Tree able to accumulate radionuclides ||
|-
| Pu-238 || || Liquidambar styraciflua || American Sweet Gum || Cs-137, Sr-90 || Tree able to accumulate radionuclides ||
|-
| Pu-238  || || Liriodendron tulipifera || Tulip tree || Cs-137, Sr-90 || Tree able to accumulate radionuclides ||
|-
| Ra || || || || || No reports found for accumulation || 
|-
| Sr || || Acer rubrum || Red maple || Cs-137, Pu-238 || Tree able to accumulate radionuclides ||
|-
| Sr || || Brassicaceae || Mustards, mustard flowers, crucifers or, cabbage family || Cd(H), Cs(H), Ni(H), Zn(H) || Phytoextraction ||
|-
| Sr || || Beta vulgaris, Chenopodiaceae, Kail? and/or Salsola? || Beet, Quinoa, Russian thistle || Sr-90, Cs-137 || Can accumulate radionuclides || 
|-
| Sr || || Eichhornia crassipes || Water Hyacinth || Cs-137, U-234, 235, 238. Also Cd(H), Cr(A), Cu(A), Hg(H), Pb, Zn(A) and pesticides. || In pH of 9, accumulates high concentrations of Sr-90 with approx. 80 to 90% of it in its roots  ||
|-
| Sr || || Eucalyptus tereticornis || Forest redgum || Cs-137 || Tree able to accumulate radionuclides ||
|-
| Sr || H-? || Helianthus annuus || Sunflower ||  || Accumulates radionuclides; high absorption rate. Phytoextraction & rhizofiltration || 
|-
| Sr || || Liquidambar styraciflua || American Sweet Gum || Cs-137, Pu-238 || Tree able to accumulate radionuclides ||
|-
| Sr || || Liriodendron tulipifera || Tulip tree || Cs-137, Pu-238 || Tree able to accumulate radionuclides ||
|-
| Sr || || Lolium multiflorum || Italian Ryegrass || Cs || Mycorrhizae: accumulates much more Cs-137 and Sr-90 when grown in Sphagnum peat than in any other medium incl. clay, sand, silt and compost. ||
|-
| Sr || 1.5-4.5 % in their shoots || Pinus radiata, Pinus ponderosa || Monterey Pine, Ponderosa pine || Petroleum hydrocarbons, organic solvents, MTBE, TCE and by-products; Cs-137 || Phytocontainment. Accumulate 1.5-4.5 % of Sr-90 in their shoots.  ||
|-
| Sr || || Apiaceae (a.k.a. Umbelliferae) || Carrot or parsley family || || Species most capable of accumulating radionuclides ||
|-
| Sr || || Fabaceae (a.k.a. Leguminosae) || Legume, pea, or bean family || || Species most capable of accumulating radionuclides ||
|-
| U || || Amaranthus || Amaranth || Cd(A), Cr(A), Cu(H), Ni(H), Pb(H), Pb(P), Zn(H) || Citric acid chelating agent and see note. Cs: maximum concentration is reached after 35 days of growth. ||
|-
| U || || Brassica juncea, Brassica chinensis, Brassica narinosa || Cabbage family || Cd(A), Cr(A), Cu(H), Ni(H), Pb(H), Pb(P), Zn(H) || Citric acid chelating agent increases uptake 1000 times, and see note || 
|-
| U-234, 235, 238  || || Eichhornia crassipes || Water Hyacinth || Cs-137, Sr-90. Also Cd(H), Cr(A), Cu(A), Hg(H), Pb, Zn(A), and pesticides. || ||
|-
| U-234, 235, 238 || 95% of U in 24 hours. || Helianthus annuus || Sunflower || ||  Accumulates radionuclides; At a contaminated wastewater site in Ashtabula, Ohio, 4 wk-old splants can remove more than 95% of uranium in 24 hours. Phytoextraction & rhizofiltration. || 
|-
| U || || Juniperus || Juniper || || Accumulates (radionuclides) U in his roots ||
|-
| U || || Picea mariana || Black Spruce || || Accumulates (radionuclides) U in his twigs ||
|-
| U || || Quercus || Oak || || Accumulates (radionuclides) U in his roots ||
|-
| U || || Kail? and/or Salsola?|| Russian thistle (tumble weed) || || ||
|-
| U || || Salix viminalis || Common Osier || Ag, Cr, Hg, Se, petroleum hydrocarbons, organic solvents, MTBE, TCE and by-products; Cd, Pb, Zn (S. viminalis); potassium ferrocyanide (S. babylonica L.) || Phytoextraction. Perchlorate (wetland halophytes) ||
|-
| U || || Silene vulgaris (a.k.a. "Silene cucubalus) || Bladder campion || || ||
|-
| U || || Zea mays || Maize || || ||
|-
| U || A-? || || || || ||
|-
| Radionuclides || || Tradescantia bracteata || Spiderwort || || Indicator for radionuclides: the stamens (normally blue or blue-purple) become pink when exposed to radionuclides ||
|-
| Benzene || || Chlorophytum comosum || spider plant || || ||
|-
| Benzene || || Ficus elastica || rubber fig, rubber bush, rubber tree, rubber plant, or Indian rubber bush || || ||
|-
| Benzene || || Kalanchoe blossfeldiana || Kalanchoe || || seems to take benzene selectively over toluene. ||
|-
| Benzene || || Pelargonium x domesticum || Germanium || || ||
|-
| BTEX || || Phanerochaete chrysosporium || White rot fungus || DDT, Dieldrin, Endodulfan, Pentachloronitro-benzene, PCP || Phytostimulation || 
|-
| DDT || || Phanerochaete chrysosporium || White rot fungus || BTEX, Dieldrin, Endodulfan, Pentachloronitro-benzene, PCP || Phytostimulation || 
|-
| Dieldrin || || Phanerochaete chrysosporium || White rot fungus || DDT, BTEX, Endodulfan, Pentachloronitro-benzene, PCP || Phytostimulation || 
|-
| Endosulfan || || Phanerochaete chrysosporium || White rot fungus || DDT, BTEX, Dieldrin, PCP, Pentachloronitro-benzène || Phytostimulation || 
|-
| Fluoranthene || || Cyclotella caspia  Cyclotella caspia  || || || Approximate rate of biodegradation on 1st day: 35%; on 6th day: 85％ (rate of physical degradation 5.86％ only). ||
|-
| Hydrocarbons || || Cynodon dactylon (L.) Pers. || Bermuda grass || || Mean petroleum hydrocarbons reduction of 68% after 1 year ||
|-
| Hydrocarbons || || Festuca arundinacea || Tall fescue || || Mean petroleum hydrocarbons reduction of 62% after 1 year ||
|-
| Hydrocarbons || || Pinus spp. || Pine spp. || Organic solvents, MTBE, TCE and by-products. Also Cs-137, Sr-90 || Phytocontainment. Tree able to accumulate radionuclides (P. ponderosa, P. radiata) ||
|-
| Hydrocarbons || || Salix spp. || Osier spp. || Ag, Cr, Hg, Se, organic solvents, MTBE, TCE and by-products; Cd, Pb, U, Zn (S. viminalis); Potassium ferrocyanide (S. babylonica L.) || Phytoextraction. Perchlorate (wetland halophytes) ||
|-
| MTBE || || Pinus spp. || Pine spp. || Petroleum hydrocarbons, Organic solvents, TCE and by-products. Also Cs-137, Sr-90 (Pinus radiata, Pinus ponderosa) || Phytocontainment. Tree able to accumulate radionuclides (P. ponderosa, P. radiata) ||
|-
| MTBE || || Salix spp. || Osier spp. || Ag, Cr, Hg, Se, petroleum hydrocarbons, organic solvents, TCE and by-products; Cd, Pb, U, Zn (S. viminalis); Potassium ferrocyanide (S. babylonica L.) || Phytoextraction, phytocontainment. Perchlorate (wetland halophytes) ||
|-
| Organic solvents || || Pinus spp. || Pine spp. || Petroleum hydrocarbons, MTBE, TCE and by-products. Also Cs-137, Sr-90 (Pinus radiata, Pinus ponderosa) || Phytocontainment. Tree able to accumulate radionuclides (P. ponderosa, P. radiata) ||
|-
| Organic solvents || || Salix spp. || Osier spp. || Ag, Cr, Hg, Se, petroleum hydrocarbons, MTBE, TCE and by-products; Cd, Pb, U, Zn (S. viminalis); Potassium ferrocyanide (S. babylonica L.) || Phytoextraction. phytocontainment . Perchlorate (wetland halophytes) ||
|-
| Organic solvents || || Pinus spp. || Pine spp. || Petroleum hydrocarbons, MTBE, TCE and by-products. Also Cs-137, Sr-90 (Pinus radiata, Pinus ponderosa) || Phytocontainment. Tree able to accumulate radionuclides (P. ponderosa, P. radiata) ||
|-
| Organic solvents || || Salix spp. || Osier spp. || Ag, Cr, Hg, Se, petroleum hydrocarbons, MTBE, TCE and by-products; Cd, Pb, U, Zn (S. viminalis); Potassium ferrocyanide (S. babylonica L.) || Phytoextraction. phytocontainment . Perchlorate (wetland halophytes) ||
|-
| PCNB || || Phanerochaete chrysosporium || White rot fungus || DDT, BTEX, Dieldrin, Endodulfan, PCP || Phytostimulation ||
|-
| Potassium ferrocyanide || 8.64% to 15.67% of initial mass || Salix babylonica L. || Weeping Willow || Ag, Cr, Hg, Se, petroleum hydrocarbons, organic solvents, MTBE, TCE and by-products (Salix spp.); Cd, Pb, U, Zn (S. viminalis); Potassium ferrocyanide (S. babylonica L.) || Phytoextraction. Perchlorate (wetland halophytes). No ferrocyanide in air from plant transpiration. A large fraction of initial mass was metabolized during transport within the plant. ||
|-
| Potassium ferrocyanide || 8.64% to 15.67% of initial mass || Salix matsudana Koidz, Salix matsudana Koidz x Salix alba L. || Hankow Willow, Hybrid Willow || Ag, Cr, Hg, Se, petroleum hydrocarbons, organic solvents, MTBE, TCE and by-products (Salix spp.); Cd, Pb, U, Zn (S. viminalis). || No ferrocyanide in air from plant transpiration. ||
|-
| PCB || || Rosa spp. || Paul’s Scarlet Rose || || Phytodegradation ||
|-
| PCP || || Phanerochaete chrysosporium || White rot fungus || DDT, BTEX, Dieldrin, Endodulfan, Pentachloronitro-benzène || Phytostimulation ||
|-
| TCE || || Chlorophytum comosum || spider plant || || Seems to lower the removal rates of benzene and methane. ||
|-
| TCE and by-products || || Pinus spp. || Pine spp. || Petroleum hydrocarbons, organic solvents, MTBE. Also Cs-137, Sr-90 (Pinus radiata, Pinus ponderosa) || Phytocontainment. Tree able to accumulate radionuclides (P. ponderosa, P. radiata) ||
|-
| TCE and by-products || || Salix spp. || Osier spp. || Ag, Cr, Hg, Se, petroleum hydrocarbons, organic solvents, MTBE; Cd, Pb, U, Zn (S. viminalis); Potassium ferrocyanide (S. babylonica L.) || Phytoextraction, phytocontainment. Perchlorate (wetland halophytes) ||
|-
| || || Musa (genus) || Banana tree || || Extra-dense root system, good for rhizofiltration. ||
|-
| || || Cyperus papyrus || Papyrus || || Extra-dense root system, good for rhizofiltration ||
|-
| || || || Taros || || Extra-dense root system, good for rhizofiltration ||
|-
| || || Brugmansia spp. || Angel's trumpet || || Semi-anaerobic, good for rhizofiltration ||
|-
| || || Caladium || Caladium || || Semi-anaerobic and resistant, good for rhizofiltration ||
|-
| || || Caltha palustris || Marsh marigold || || Semi-anaerobic and resistant, good for rhizofiltration  ||
|-
| || || Iris pseudacorus || Yellow Flag, paleyellow iris ||  || Semi-anaerobic and resistant, good for rhizofiltration ||
|-
| || || Mentha aquatica || Water Mint || || Semi-anaerobic and resistant, good for rhizofiltration || 
|-
| || || Scirpus lacustris || Bulrush || || Semi-anaerobic and resistant, good for rhizofiltration ||
|-
| || || Typha latifolia || Broadleaf cattail || || Semi-anaerobic and resistant, good for rhizofiltration ||
|}

Notes
 Uranium: The symbol for Uranium is sometimes given as Ur instead of U. According to Ulrich Schmidt and others, plants' concentration of uranium is considerably increased by an application of citric acid, which solubilizes the uranium (and other metals).
 Radionuclides: Cs-137 and Sr-90 are not removed from the top 0.4 meters of soil even under high rainfall, and migration rate from the top few centimeters of soil is slow.
 Radionuclides: Plants with mycorrhizal associations are often more effective than non-mycorrhizal plants at the uptake of radionuclides.
 Radionuclides: In general, soils containing higher amounts of organic matter will allow plants to accumulate higher amounts of radionuclides. See also note on Lolium multiflorum in Paasikallio 1984. Plant uptake is also increased with a higher cation exchange capacity for Sr-90 availability, and a lower base saturation for uptake of both Sr-90 and Cs-137.
 Radionuclides: Fertilizing the soil with nitrogen if needed will indirectly increase the take-up of radionuclides by generally boosting the plant's overall growth and more specifically roots' growth. But some fertilizers such as K or Ca compete with the radionuclides for cation exchange sites, and will not increase the take-up of radionuclides.
 Radionuclides: Zhu and Smolders, lab test: Cs uptake is mostly influenced by K supply. The uptake of radiocaesium depends mainly on two transport pathways on plant root cell membranes: the K+ transporter and the K+ channel pathway. Cs is likely transported by the K+ transport system. When external concentration of K is limited to low levels, le K+ transporter shows little discrimination against Cs+; if K supply is high, the K+ channel is dominant and shows high discrimination against Cs+. Caesium is very mobile within the plant, but the ratio Cs/K is not uniform within the plant. Phytoremediation as a possible option for the decontamination of caesium-contaminated soils is limited mainly by that it takes tens of years and creates large volumes of waste.
 Alpine pennycress or Alpine Pennygrass is found as Alpine Pennycrest in (some books).
The references are so far mostly from academic trial papers, experiments and generally of exploration of that field.
 Radionuclides: Broadley and Willey find that across 30 taxa studied, Gramineae and Chenopodiaceae show the strongest correlation between Rb (K) and Cs concentration. The fast-growing Chenopodiaceae discriminate approx. 9 times less between Rb and Cs than the slow-growingGramineae'', and this correlate with highest and lowest concentrations achieved respectively.
 Caesium: In Chernobyl-derived radioactivity, the amount of contamination is dependent on the roughness of bark, absolute bark surface and the existence of leaves during the deposition. The major contamination of the shoots is from direct deposition on the trees.

Annotated References

Links to the other sections
Hyperaccumulators table – 1 : Al, Ag, As, Be, Cr, Cu, Mn, Hg, Mo, Naphthalene, Pb, Pd, Pt, Se, Zn
Hyperaccumulators table – 2 : Nickel

+03
Biophysics
Hyperaccumulators|+03
Pollution control technologies
Lists of plants
Science-related lists